This is the progression of world record improvements of the high jump W60 division of Masters athletics. Also see Masters women high jump world record progression.

Key

References

Masters Athletics High Jump list

Masters athletics world record progressions
High